This is a list of New Zealand television related events from 2006.

Events
25 June - The 1983 Miss Universe Lorraine Downes and her partner Aaron Gilmore win the second series of Dancing with the Stars.
29 October - Matthew Saunoa wins the third and final series of New Zealand Idol.

Debuts

Domestic
7 May - Sparkle Friends (TV2) (2006-2011)
25 May - Orange Roughies (TV One) (2006-2008)
21 July - The Killian Curse (TV2) (2006-2008)
18 December - Karaoke High (TVNZ) (2006-2007)
The Lost Children (TVNZ) (2006)

International
 Curious George (TV3)
 Numbers (TV3)
 Prison Break (TV3)
 Prehistoric Park (TV3)
/ Harry and His Bucket Full of Dinosaurs (TV3)
 Avatar: The Last Airbender (TV3)
 Firehouse Tales (TV2)
 Coconut Fred's Fruit Salad Island (TV2)

New channels

Cable
1 August - Nickelodeon (New Zealand)

Television shows

2000s
Dancing with the Stars (2005-2009)

Ending this year
29 October - New Zealand Idol (TV2) (2004-2006)

Births

Deaths